Zizhu Hi-tech Park is a metro station on Line 15 of the Shanghai Metro. Located at the intersection of Dongchuan Road and South Lianhua Road in Minhang District, Shanghai, the station is the southern terminus of the line and opened with the rest of Line 15 in early 2021. The line was originally scheduled to open by the end of 2020, however on 24 December 2020, officials announced that it will instead open before the Chinese New Year festival period in 2021. This station opened on 23 January 2021.
Due to this station being the end of line, this station is the only station after South Hongmei Road where the Interior is not blue.

References 

Railway stations in Shanghai
Shanghai Metro stations in Minhang District
Line 15, Shanghai Metro
Railway stations in China opened in 2021